Participatory design (originally co-operative design, now often co-design) is an approach to design attempting to actively involve all  stakeholders (e.g. employees, partners, customers, citizens, end users) in the design process to help ensure the result meets their needs and is usable. Participatory design is an approach which is focused on processes and procedures of design and is not a design style. The term is used in a variety of fields e.g. software design,  urban design, architecture, landscape architecture, product design, sustainability, graphic design, planning, and health services development as a way of creating environments that are more responsive and appropriate to their inhabitants' and users' cultural, emotional, spiritual and practical needs. It is also one approach to placemaking.

Recent research suggests that designers create more innovative concepts and ideas when working within a co-design environment with others than they do when creating ideas on their own.

Participatory design has been used in many settings and at various scales. For some, this approach has a political dimension of user empowerment and democratization. For others, it is seen as a way of abrogating design responsibility and innovation by designers.

In several Scandinavian countries, during the 1960s and 1970s, participatory design was rooted in work with trade unions; its ancestry also includes action research and sociotechnical design.

Definition

In participatory design, participants (putative, potential or future) are invited to cooperate with designers, researchers and developers during an innovation process. Co-design requires the end user's participation: not only in decision making but also in idea generation. Potentially, they participate during several stages of an innovation process: they participate during the initial exploration and problem definition both to help define the problem and to focus ideas for solution, and during development, they help evaluate proposed solutions. Maarten Pieters and Stefanie Jansen describe co-design as part of a complete co-creation process, which refers to the "transparent process of value creation in ongoing, productive collaboration with, and supported by all relevant parties, with end-users playing a central role" and covers all stages of a development process.

Differing terms
In  "Co-designing for Society", Deborah Szebeko and Lauren Tan list various precursors of co-design, starting with the Scandinavian participatory design movement and then state "Co-design differs from some of these areas as it includes all stakeholders of an issue not just the users, throughout the entire process from research to implementation."

In contrast, Elizabeth Sanders and Peter Stappers state that "the terminology used until the recent obsession with what is now called co-creation/co-design" was "participatory design".

Similarly, a topic of interest is that of Golsby-Smith's "Fourth-Order Design" which outlines a design process in which end-user participation is required and favours individual process over outcome.

Fourth-order design 
This design process brings in cultural contexts to the design process. Culture as defined by Buchanan "is not a state, expressed in an ideology or a body of doctrines. It is an activity. Culture is the activity of ordering, disordering and reordering in the search for understanding and for values which guide action." Therefore, to design for the fourth-order one must design within the widest scope. The system is discussion and the focus falls onto process rather than outcome.

Different dimensions 
As described by Sanders and Stappers, one could position co-design as a form of human-centered design across two different dimensions. One dimension is the emphasis on research or design, another dimension is how much people are involved. Therefore there are many forms of co-design, with different degrees of emphasis on research or design and different degrees of stakeholder involvement. For instance, one of the forms of co-design which involves stakeholders strongly early at the front end design process in the creative activities is generative co-design. Generative co-design is increasingly being used to involve different stakeholders as patient, care professionals and designers actively in the creative making process to develop health services.

History

From the 1960s onward there was a growing demand for greater consideration of community opinions in major decision-making. In Australia many people believed that they were not being planned 'for' but planned 'at'. (Nichols 2009). A lack of consultation made the planning system seem paternalistic and without proper consideration of how changes to the built environment affected its primary users. In Britain "the idea that the public should participate was first raised in 1965" (Taylor, 1998, p. 86). However the level of participation is an important issue. At a minimum public workshops and hearings have now been included in almost every planning endeavour. Yet this level of consultation can simply mean information about change without detailed participation. Involvement that 'recognises an active part in plan making' (Taylor, 1998, p. 86) has not always been straightforward to achieve.  Participatory design has attempted to create a platform for active participation in the design process, for end users.

History in Scandinavia

Participatory design was actually born in Scandinavia and called cooperative design. However, when the methods were presented to the US community 'cooperation' was a word that didn't resonate with the strong separation between workers and managers - they weren't supposed to discuss ways of working face-to-face. Hence, 'participatory' was instead used as the initial Participatory Design sessions weren't a direct cooperation between workers and managers, sitting in the same room discussing how to improve their work environment and tools, but there were separate sessions for workers and managers. Each group was participating in the process, not directly cooperating. (in historical review of Cooperative Design, at a Scandinavian conference).

In Scandinavia, research projects on user participation in systems development date back to the 1970s. The so-called "collective resource approach" developed strategies and techniques for workers to influence the design and use of computer applications at the workplace: The Norwegian Iron and Metal Workers Union (NJMF) project took a first move from traditional research to working with people, directly changing the role of the union clubs in the project.

The Scandinavian projects developed an action research approach, emphasizing active co-operation between researchers and workers of the organization to help improve the latter's work situation.  While researchers got their results, the people whom they worked with were equally entitled to get something out of the project. The approach built on people's own experiences, providing for them resources to be able to act in their current situation. The view of organizations as fundamentally harmonious—according to which conflicts in an organization are regarded as pseudo-conflicts or "problems" dissolved by good analysis and increased communication—was rejected in favor of a view of organizations recognizing fundamental "un-dissolvable" conflicts in organizations (Ehn & Sandberg, 1979).

In the Utopia project (Bødker et al., 1987, Ehn, 1988), the major achievements were the experience-based design methods, developed through the focus on hands-on experiences, emphasizing the need for technical and organizational alternatives (Bødker et al., 1987).

The parallel Florence project (Gro Bjerkness & Tone Bratteteig) started a long line of Scandinavian research projects in the health sector. In particular, it worked with nurses and developed approaches for nurses to get a voice in the development of work and IT in hospitals. The Florence project put gender on the agenda with its starting point in a highly gendered work environment.

The 1990s led to a number of projects including the AT project (Bødker et al., 1993) and the EureCoop/EuroCode projects (Grønbæk, Kyng & Mogensen, 1995).

In recent years, it has been a major challenge to participatory design to embrace the fact that much technology development no longer happens as design of isolated systems in well-defined communities of work (Beck, 2002). At the dawn of the 21st century, we use technology at work, at home, in school, and while on the move.

Co-design
Co-design is often used by trained designers who recognize the difficulty in properly understanding the cultural, societal, or usage scenarios encountered by their user. C. K. Prahalad and Venkat Ramaswamy are usually given credit for bringing co-creation/co-design to the minds of those in the business community with the 2004 publication of their book, The Future of Competition: Co-Creating Unique Value with Customers. They propose:

The phrase co-design is also used in reference to the simultaneous development of interrelated software and hardware systems. The term co-design has become popular in mobile phone development, where the two perspectives of hardware and software design are brought into a co-design process.

Results directly related to integrating co-design into existing frameworks is "researchers and practitioners have seen that co-creation practiced at the early front end of the design development process can have an impact with positive, long-range consequences."

New role of the designer under co-design 
Co-design is an attempt to define a new evolution of the design process and with that, there is an evolution of the designer. Within the co-design process, the designer is required to shift their role from one of expertise to one of an egalitarian mindset. The designer must believe that all people are capable of creativity and problem solving. The designer no longer exists from the isolated roles of researcher and creator, but now must shift to roles such as philosopher and facilitator. This shift allows for the designer to position themselves and their designs within the context of the world around them creating better awareness. This awareness is important because in the designer's attempt to answer a question, "[they] must address all other related questions about values, perceptions, and worldview". Therefore, by shifting the role of the designer not only do the designs better address their cultural context yet so do the discussions around them.

Discourses
Discourses in the PD literature have been sculpted by three main concerns: (1) the politics of design, (2) the nature of participation, and (3) methods, tools and techniques for carrying out design projects (Finn Kensing & Jeanette Blomberg, 1998, p. 168).

Politics of design 
The politics of design have been the concern for many design researchers and practitioners. Kensing and Blomberg illustrate the main concerns which related to the introduction of new frameworks such as system design which related to the introduction of computer-based systems and power dynamics that emerge within the workspace. The automation introduced by system design has created concerns within unions and workers as it threatened their involvement in production and their ownership over their work situation. Asaro (2000) offers a detailed analysis of the politics of design and the inclusion of "users" in the design process.

Nature of participation 
Major international organizations such as Project for Public Spaces create opportunities for rigorous participation in the design and creation of place, believing that it is the essential ingredient for successful environments. Rather than simply consulting the public, PPS creates a platform for the community to participate and co-design new areas, which reflect their intimate knowledge.  Providing insights, which independent design professionals such as architects or even local government planners may not have.

Using a method called Place Performance Evaluation or (Place Game), groups from the community are taken on the site of proposed development, where they use their knowledge to develop design strategies, which would benefit the community.
"Whether the participants are schoolchildren or professionals, the exercise produces dramatic results because it relies on the expertise of people who use the place every day, or who are the potential users of the place."  This successfully engages with the ultimate idea of participatory design, where various stakeholders who will be the users of the end product, are involved in the design process as a collective.

Similar projects have had success in Melbourne, Australia particularly in relation to contested sites, where design solutions are often harder to establish. The Talbot Reserve in the suburb of St. Kilda faced numerous problems of use, such as becoming a regular spot for sex workers and drug users to congregate. A Design In, which incorporated a variety of key users in the community about what they wanted for the future of the reserve allowed traditionally marginalised voices to participate in the design process.  Participants described it as 'a transforming experience as they saw the world through different eyes.' (Press, 2003, p. 62).  This is perhaps the key attribute of participatory design, a process which, allows multiple voices to be heard and involved in the design, resulting in outcomes which suite a wider range of users. It builds empathy within the system and users where it is implemented, which makes solving larger problems more holistically. As planning affects everyone it is believed that "those whose livelihoods, environments and lives are at stake should be involved in the decisions which affect them" (Sarkissian and Perglut, 1986, p. 3). C. West Churchman said systems thinking "begins when first you view the world through the eyes of another".

In the built environment 

Participatory design has many applications in development and changes to the built environment. It has particular currency to planners and architects, in relation to placemaking and community regeneration projects. It potentially offers a far more democratic approach to the design process as it involves more than one stakeholder. By incorporating a variety of views there is greater opportunity for successful outcomes. Many universities and major institutions are beginning to recognise its importance. The UN, Global studio involved students from Columbia University, University of Sydney and Sapienza University of Rome to provide design solutions for Vancouver's downtown eastside, which suffered from drug- and alcohol-related problems. The process allowed cross-discipline participation from planners, architects and industrial designers, which focused on collaboration and the sharing of ideas and stories, as opposed to rigid and singular design outcomes. (Kuiper, 2007, p. 52)

Public interest design 

Public interest design is a design movement, extending to architecture, with the main aim of structuring design around the needs of the community. At the core of its application is participatory design. Through allowing individuals to have a say in the process of design of their own surrounding built environment, design can become proactive and tailored towards addressing wider social issues facing that community. Public interest design is meant to reshape conventional modern architectural practice. Instead of having each construction project solely meet the needs of the individual, public interest design addresses wider social issues at their core. This shift in architectural practice is a structural and systemic one, allowing design to serve communities responsibly. Solutions to social issues can be addressed in a long-term manner through such design, serving the public, and involving it directly in the process through participatory design. The built environment can become the very reason for social and community issues to arise if not executed properly and responsibly. Conventional architectural practice often does cause such problems since only the paying client has a say in the design process. That is why many architects throughout the world are employing participatory design and practicing their profession more responsibly, encouraging a wider shift in architectural practice. Several architects have largely succeeded in disproving theories that deem public interest design and participatory design financially and organizationally not feasible. Their work is setting the stage for the expansion of this movement, providing valuable data on its effectiveness and the ways in which it can be carried out.

From community consultation to community design

Many local governments require community consultation in any major changes to the built environment. Community involvement in the planning process is almost a standard requirement in most strategic changes. Community involvement in local decision making creates a sense of empowerment. The City of Melbourne Swanston Street redevelopment project received over 5000 responses from the public allowing them to participate in the design process by commenting on seven different design options.  While the City of Yarra recently held a "Stories in the Street" consultation, to record peoples ideas about the future of Smith Street. It offered participants a variety of mediums to explore their opinions such as mapping, photo surveys and storytelling. Although local councils are taking positive steps towards participatory design as opposed to traditional top down approaches to planning, many communities are moving to take design into their own hands.

Portland, Oregon City Repair Project is a form of participatory design, which involves the community co-designing problem areas together to make positive changes to their environment. It involves collaborative decision-making and design without traditional involvement from local government or professionals but instead runs on volunteers from the community. The process has created successful projects such as intersection repair, which saw a misused intersection develop into a successful community square.

In Malawi, a UNICEF WASH programme trialled participatory design development for latrines in order to ensure that users participate in creating and selecting sanitation technologies that are appropriate and affordable for them. The process provided an opportunity for community members to share their traditional knowledge and skills in partnership with designers and researchers.

Peer-to-peer urbanism is a form of decentralized, participatory design for urban environments and individual buildings.  It borrows organizational ideas from the open-source software movement, so that knowledge about construction methods and urban design schemes is freely exchanged.

In software development
In the English-speaking world, the term has a particular currency in the world of software development, especially in circles connected to Computer Professionals for Social Responsibility (CPSR), who have put on a series of Participatory Design Conferences. It overlaps with the approach extreme programming takes to user involvement in design, but (possibly because of its European trade union origins) the Participatory Design tradition puts more emphasis on the involvement of a broad population of users rather than a small number of user representatives.

Participatory design can be seen as a move of end-users into the world of researchers and developers, whereas empathic design can be seen as a move of researchers and developers into the world of end-users. There is a very significant differentiation between user-design and user-centered design in that there is an emancipatory theoretical foundation, and a systems theory bedrock (Ivanov, 1972, 1995), on which user-design is founded. Indeed, user-centered design is a useful and important construct, but one that suggests that users are taken as centers in the design process, consulting with users heavily, but not allowing users to make the decisions, nor empowering users with the tools that the experts use.  For example, Wikipedia content is user-designed. Users are given the necessary tools to make their own entries. Wikipedia's underlying wiki software is based on user-centered design: while users are allowed to propose changes or have input on the design, a smaller and more specialized group decide about features and system design.

Participatory work in software development has historically tended toward two distinct trajectories, one in Scandinavia and northern Europe, and the other in North America.  The Scandinavian and northern European tradition has remained closer to its roots in the labor movement (e.g., Beck, 2002; Bjerknes, Ehn, and Kyng, 1987).  The North American and Pacific rim tradition has tended to be both broader (e.g., including managers and executives as "stakeholders" in design) and more circumscribed (e.g., design of individual features as contrasted with the Scandinavian approach to the design of entire systems and design of the work that the system is supposed to support) (e.g., Beyer and Holtzblatt, 1998; Noro and Imada, 1991).  However, some more recent work has tended to combine the two approaches (Bødker et al., 2004; Muller, 2007).

Research methodology 
Increasingly researchers are focusing on co-design as a way of doing research, and therefore are developing parts of its research methodology. For instance, in the field of generative co-design Vandekerckhove et al. have proposed a methodology to assemble a group of stakeholders to participate in generative co-design activities in the early innovation process. They propose first to sample a group of potential stakeholders through snowball sampling, afterwards interview these people and assess their knowledge and inference experience, lastly they propose to assemble a diverse group of stakeholders according to their knowledge and inference experience.

See also
 Computer-supported cooperative work
 Design thinking
 Participatory action research
 Permaculture
 Public participation
 Service design
 User innovation
 User participation in architecture (N.J. Habraken, Giancarlo De Carlo, and Structuralists such as Aldo van Eyck)

Notes

References

 Asaro, Peter M. (2000). "Transforming society by transforming technology: the science and politics of participatory design." Accounting Management and Information Technology  10: 257–290.
 Banathy, B.H. (1992).  Comprehensive systems design in education:  building a design culture in education.  Educational Technology, 22(3) 33–35.
 Beck, E. (2002). P for Political - Participation is Not Enough. SJIS, Volume 14 – 2002
 Belotti, V. and Bly, S., 1996. Walking away from desktop computer: distributed collaboration and mobility in a product design team. In Proceedings of CSCW "96, Cambridge, Mass., November 16–20, ACM press: 209–218.
 Beyer, H., and Holtzblatt, K. (1998).  Contextual design: Defining customer-centered systems.  San Francisco: Morgan Kaufmann.
 Button, G. and Sharrock, W. 1996. Project work: the organisation of collaborative design and development in software engineering. CSCW Journal, 5 (4), p. 369–386.
 Bødker, S. and Iversen, O. S. (2002):  Staging a professional participatory design practice: moving PD beyond the initial fascination of user involvement. In Proceedings of the Second Nordic Conference on Human-Computer interaction (Aarhus, Denmark, October 19–23, 2002). NordiCHI '02, vol. 31. ACM Press, New York, NY, 11-18
 Bødker, K., Kensing, F., and Simonsen, J. (2004). Participatory IT design:  Designing for business and workplace realities.  Cambridge, MA, USA:  MIT Press.
 Bødker, S., Christiansen, E., Ehn, P., Markussen, R., Mogensen, P., & Trigg, R. (1993). The AT Project: Practical research in cooperative design, DAIMI No. PB-454. Department of Computer Science, Aarhus University.
 Bødker, S., Ehn, P., Kammersgaard, J., Kyng, M., & Sundblad, Y. (1987). A Utopian experience: In G. Bjerknes, P. Ehn, & M. Kyng. (Eds.), Computers and democracy: A Scandinavian challenge (pp. 251–278). Aldershot, UK: Avebury.
 Carr, A.A. (1997).  User-design in the creation of human learning systems.  Educational Technology Research and Development, 45 (3), 5–22.
 Carr-Chellman, A.A., Cuyar, C., & Breman, J. (1998).  User-design:  A case application in health care training.  Educational Technology Research and Development, 46 (4), 97–114.
 Divitini, M. & Farshchian, B.A. 1999. Using Email and WWW in a Distributed Participatory Design Project. In SIGGROUP Bulletin 20(1), pp. 10–15.
 Ehn, P. & Kyng, M., 1991. Cardboard Computers: Mocking-it-up or Hands-on the Future. In, Greenbaum, J. & Kyng, M. (Eds.) Design at Work, pp. 169 – 196. Hillsdale, New Jersey: Laurence Erlbaum Associates.
 Ehn, P. (1988). Work-oriented design of computer artifacts. Falköping: Arbetslivscentrum/Almqvist & Wiksell International, Hillsdale, NJ: Lawrence Erlbaum Associates
 Ehn, P. and Sandberg, Å. (1979). God utredning: In Sandberg, Å. (Ed.): Utredning och förändring i förvaltningen[Investigation and change in administration]. Stockholm: Liber.
 Grudin, J. (1993). Obstacles to Participatory Design in Large Product Development Organizations: In Namioka, A. & Schuler, D. (Eds.), Participatory design. Principles and practices (pp. 99–122). Hillsdale NJ: Lawrence Erlbaum Associates.
 Grønbæk, K., Kyng, M. & P. Mogensen (1993). CSCW challenges: Cooperative Design in Engineering Projects, Communications of the ACM, 36, 6, pp. 67–77
 Ivanov, K. (1972). Quality-control of information: On the concept of accuracy of information in data banks and in management information systems. The University of Stockholm and The Royal Institute of Technology. Doctoral dissertation.
 Ivanov, K. (1995). A subsystem in the design of informatics: Recalling an archetypal engineer. In B. Dahlbom (Ed.), The infological equation: Essays in honor of Börje Langefors, (pp. 287–301). Gothenburg: Gothenburg University, Dept. of Informatics. Note #16.
 Kensing, F. & Blomberg, J. 1998. Participatory Design: Issues and Concerns In Computer Supported Cooperative Work, Vol. 7, pp. 167–185.
 Kensing, F. 2003. Methods and Practices in Participatory Design. ITU Press, Copenhagen, Denmark.
 Kuiper, Gabrielle, June 2007, Participatory planning and design in the downtown eastside: reflections on Global Studio Vancouver, Australian Planner, v.44, no.2, pp. 52–53
 Kyng, M. (1989). Designing for a dollar a day. Office, Technology and People, 4(2): 157–170.
 Muller, M.J. (2007).  Participatory design:  The third space in HCI (revised).  In J. Jacko and A. Sears (eds.), Handbook of HCI 2nd Edition.  Mahway NJ USA:  Erlbaum.
 Naghsh, A. M., Ozcan M. B. 2004. Gabbeh - A Tool For Computer Supported Collaboration in Electronic Paper-Prototyping. In *Dearden A & Watts L. (Eds). Proceedings of HCI "04: Design for Life volume 2. British HCI Group pp77–80
 Näslund, T., 1997. Computers in Context –But in Which Context? In Kyng, M. & Mathiassen, L. (Eds). Computers and Design in Context. MIT Press, Cambridge, MA. pp. 171–200.
 Nichols, Dave, (2009) Planning Thought and History Lecture, The University of Melbourne
 Noro, K., &  Imada, A. S.  (Eds.).  (1991)  Participatory ergonomics.  London: Taylor and Francis.
 Perry, M. & Sanderson, D. 1998. Coordinating Joint Design Work: The Role of Communication and Artefacts. Design Studies, Vol. 19, pp. 273–28
 Press, Mandy, 2003. "Communities for Everyone: redesigning contested public places in Victoria", Chapter 9 of end Weeks et al. (eds), Community Practices in Australia (French Forests NSW: Pearson Sprint Print), pp. 59–65
 Pan, Y., 2018. From Field to Simulator: Visualising Ethnographic Outcomes to Support Systems Developers. University of Oslo. Doctoral dissertation.
 Reigeluth, C. M. (1993).  Principles of educational systems design.  International Journal of Educational Research, 19 (2), 117–131.
 Sarkissian, W,  Perglut, D. 1986, Community Participation in Practice, The Community Participation handbook, Second edition, Murdoch University
 Sanders, E. B. N., & Stappers, P. J. (2008). Co-creation and the new landscapes of design. Codesign, 4(1), 5–18.
 Santa Rosa, J.G. & Moraes, A. Design Participativo: técnicas para inclusão de usuários no processo de ergodesign de interfaces. Rio de Janeiro: RioBooks, 2012.
 Schuler, D. & Namioka, A. (1993). Participatory design: Principles and practices.  Hillsdale, NJ: Erlbaum.
Trainer, Ted 1996, Towards a sustainable economy: The need for fundamental change Envirobook/ Jon Carpenter, Sydney/Oxford, pp. 135–167
Trischler, Jakob, Simon J. Pervan, Stephen J. Kelly and Don R. Scott (2018). The value of codesign: The effect of customer involvement in service design teams. Journal of Service Research, 21(1): 75–100. https://doi.org/10.1177/1094670517714060 
 Wojahn, P. G., Neuwirth, C. M., Bullock, B. 1998. Effects of Interfaces for Annotation on Communication in a Collaborative Task. In Proceedings of CHI "98, LA, CA, April 18–23, ACM press: 456–463
 Von Bertalanffy, L. (1968).  General systems theory.  New York: Braziller.

Design
Innovation
Product development
Citizen science models